Ariel Behar and Andrey Golubev were the defending champions but chose not to defend their title.

Orlando Luz and Rafael Matos won the title after defeating Sergio Galdós and Renzo Olivo 6–4, 7–6(7–5) in the final.

Seeds

Draw

References

External links
 Main draw

Internazionali di Tennis del Friuli Venezia Giulia - Doubles
2021 Doubles